Wheel of Ashes is a 1968 French film directed by Peter Emmanuel Goldman.

Cast
Pierre Clémenti
Katinka Bo
Pierre Besançon

External links

Wheel of Ashes at BFI
Wheel of Ashes at Letterbox DVD

1968 films
1960s French-language films
French drama films
1960s French films